İpek Kaya (born 28 October 1994) is a footballer who plays as a defender for Division 1 Féminine club Soyaux. Born in France, she represents Turkey at international level.

Early years
She was born to Turkish immigrant parents in L'Aigle, Orne in France on October 28, 1994. She is a student of law.

Playing career

Club
She began her football career at her hometown club FC du Pays Aiglon in October 2004, where she was until June 2010. The next month, Kaya was transferred by  FCF Condé, then competing in the French top women's league of Division 1 Féminine. For the 2015–16 season, the defender signed for ASJ Soyaux-Charente, another club of Division 1 Féminine. She then went to Stade Brestois 29, where she played the 2016–17 season. Kaya transferred in the 2017–18 season to FC Metz, where she played three seasons and served as the captain. In June 2020, she returned to her former club Stade Brestois 29.

International

İpek Kaya was selected twice to the France women's national under-19 football team. However, she preferred to play for Turkey.

She debuted in the Turkey women's national team in the friendly match against Georgia on February 24, 2015. She took part at the UEFA Women's Euro 2017 qualifying Group 5 for Turkey. She played in three games of the 2019 FIFA Women's World Cup qualification – UEFA preliminary round – Group 4. She took part in five matches of the UEFA Women's Euro 2021 qualifying Group A.

References

External links

 
 
 
 

1994 births
Living people
Citizens of Turkey through descent
Turkish women's footballers
Women's association football defenders
Turkey women's international footballers
Sportspeople from Orne
French women's footballers
French people of Turkish descent
ASJ Soyaux-Charente players
Footballers from Normandy